Curry is a generic description for a variety of spiced dishes, especially from Asia.

Curry  may also refer to:

Places

United States
 Curry, Pike County, Alabama, an unincorporated community
 Curry, Talladega County, Alabama, an unincorporated community
 Curry, Walker County, Alabama, an unincorporated community
 Curry, Alaska, an unincorporated community
 Curry County, New Mexico
 Curry County, Oregon
 Curry Canyon (Utah), a canyon on the east edge of Emery County, Utah

Elsewhere
 Curry, County Sligo, a townland of County Sligo, Ireland
 Curry Island, Nunavut, Canada

People and fictional characters
 Curry (surname), a common surname used in Ireland, Scotland and England

Computing and mathematics
 Curry (programming language), a functional logic programming language
 Currying, a technique for transforming a function in mathematics and computer science

Businesses 
 Currys, a British electricals retailer
 Currys plc, a British electrical retailer holding company
 Currys Digital, a former British electricals retailer

Plants
 Curry plant, Helichrysum italicum, a flowering plant of the daisy family, with aromatic leaves
 Curry tree, with aromatic leaves

Other uses
 Curry College, a small private college in Milton, Massachusetts, United States
 Currycomb (or curry), a device used in currying (grooming) horses
 Curry ketchup, a spiced variant of ketchup from Germany

See also
 Curry Village, California, United States, a resort
 Curie (disambiguation)
 Currie (disambiguation)
 Cury, a civil parish and village in southwest Cornwall, England
 Karahi, a type of thick, circular, and deep cooking-pot